Morris Levy or variant, may refer to:

Morris Levy, an American music industry executive
Morris S. Levy, an American film and television producer

See also

 Moses Levy (disambiguation), a de-anglicized form of Morris Levy
 Moshe Levy (disambiguation), a de-anglicized form of Morris Levy
 Maurice (disambiguation)
 Morris (disambiguation)
 Levy (disambiguation)
 Levi (disambiguation)